Jens Hegeler (born 22 January 1988) is a German former professional footballer who played as a midfielder.

Career

Youth and early career
Hegeler began his career at SV Westhoven in 1993 and moved after two years to SpVgg Porz. He left Porz after three years when he was scouted by 1. FC Köln in 1998. He played six years in Köln's youth team before he moved to Yurdumspor Köln in the German Oberliga in 2004. After one year he left Cologne and moved to VfL Leverkusen. In June 2006 he joined Bayer Leverkusen. He was loaned out to FC Augsburg on 7 January 2009 until the end of the 2009–10 season. In July 2010, he joined 1. FC Nürnberg on a two-season-long loan. Hegeler became a key player in Nürnberg's successful squad and played in every 34 matches of the season. Hegeler returned to Leverkusen at the start of the 2012–13 season.

On 2 October 2013, Hegeler secured a 2–1 win for Leverkusen over Real Sociedad in the Champions League with a stoppage-time free-kick.

Hertha BSC
On 8 May 2014, he signed a three-year contract with Hertha BSC.

Bristol City
On 4 January 2017, it was announced by Bristol City that Hegeler had joined them on a -year deal for an undisclosed fee. On 7 January 2017, he made his debut in the FA Cup Third Round tie against Fleetwood Town. He scored his first goal for Bristol City in a 5–0 EFL Cup win against Plymouth Argyle on 8 August 2017. On 19 December 2018, it was announced Hegeler had left Bristol City by mutual consent.

Career statistics

References

External links
 
 
 

1988 births
Living people
Footballers from Cologne
1. FC Köln players
German footballers
Association football midfielders
Germany under-21 international footballers
Bundesliga players
2. Bundesliga players
English Football League players
Bayer 04 Leverkusen players
Bayer 04 Leverkusen II players
FC Augsburg players
1. FC Nürnberg players
Hertha BSC players
Hertha BSC II players
Bristol City F.C. players
German expatriate footballers
German expatriate sportspeople in England
Expatriate footballers in England